Mạo Khê is a ward of Đông Triều town in Quảng Ninh Province, Vietnam.

It is the location of the 1951 "Battle of Mạo Khê" in the First Indochina War.

References

Communes of Quảng Ninh province
Populated places in Quảng Ninh province